Powers Coal Camp is an unincorporated community and coal town in Knox County, Kentucky, United States.

References

Unincorporated communities in Knox County, Kentucky
Unincorporated communities in Kentucky
Coal towns in Kentucky